Tan Chung (born 18 April 1929, in Matubahar, Johor) is an authority on Chinese history, Sino-Indian relations and cultural exchange. He has been a doyen of Chinese cultural studies in India for nearly half a century.

Early life
After initial education in China came to Santiniketan in 1955. On completing his Ph D from Visva Bharati University, taught in NDA, Khadakvasla, then joined Delhi University as professor of Chinese and became  head of the department of Chinese and Japanese studies at Jawaharlal Nehru University. His wife, Huang I-Shu, taught Chinese at Delhi University.

Career
Tan Chung taught at Jawaharlal Nehru University (JNU) and the University of Delhi for many years. His father, Tan Yun-Shan (1898-1983), was the founder of Cheena Bhavana at Santiniketan and a key figure driving Nationalist China's interactions with the Indian freedom movement during the 1930s and 1940s.  After Tan Chung's retirement from JNU in 1994, he worked as a Research Professor at Indira Gandhi National Centre for the Arts, New Delhi and currently lives in Chicago, United States. He has been Honorary Director of the ICS/Institute of Chinese Studies, New Delhi.

A conference in his honor, at the occasion of his 80th birthday, was held in New Delhi in December 2008.

Awards
In 2010, he was awarded the Padma Bhushan, the third highest civilian honour by the Govt. of India and the China-India Friendship Award by the Chinese Premier Wen Jiabao in the same year.

In June 2013, Yunnan Academy of Social Science conferred upon him the honorary Fellowship of the Academy.

In December 2013, Visva-Bharati University conferred Deshikhottama (D. Litt and the highest honor of the University) upon Professor Tan Chung.

In August 2018, Sage Published his book on understanding China, China: A 5,000-year Odyssey and has received excellent reviews from leading scholars in the world.

References 

Indian sinologists
Academic staff of Delhi University
1929 births
Living people
People associated with Santiniketan
Academic staff of Jawaharlal Nehru University
Recipients of the Padma Bhushan in literature & education